Charles-Henri Sanson, full title Chevalier Charles-Henri Sanson de Longval (15 February 1739 – 4 July 1806), was the royal executioner of France during the reign of King Louis XVI, as well as High Executioner of the First French Republic. He administered capital punishment in the city of Paris for over forty years. By his own hand he executed nearly 3,000 people, including Robert-François Damiens, who attempted to assassinate King Louis XV. Sanson would later execute King Louis XVI.

Family history 
Charles-Henri Sanson was the fourth in a six-generation family dynasty of executioners. His great-grandfather, a soldier in the French royal army named Charles Sanson (1658–1695) of Abbeville, was appointed as Executioner of Paris in 1688. Upon his death in 1695, the Sanson patriarch passed the office to his son, also named Charles (1681 – September 12, 1726). When this second Charles died, an official regency held the position until his young son, Charles Jean-Baptiste Sanson (1719 – August 4, 1778), reached maturity. The third Sanson served all his life as High Executioner, and in his time fathered 16 children, 10 of whom survived to adulthood. The eldest of his sons, Charles-Henri—known as "The Great Sanson"—was apprentice to his father for twenty years and was sworn into the office on 26 December 1778.

Life 
Charles-Henri Sanson was born in Paris to Charles Jean-Baptiste Sanson and his first wife Madeleine Tronson. He was first raised in the convent school at Rouen until in 1753 a father of another student recognised his father as the executioner and he had to leave the school in order to not ruin the school's reputation. Charles-Henri was then privately educated. He had a strong aversion to his family's business.

Executioner as a career 

His father's paralysis and the assertiveness of his paternal grandmother, Anne-Marthe Sanson, led Charles-Henri to leave his study of medicine and to assume the job of executioner in order to guarantee the livelihood of his family. As executioner, he came to be known as "Monsieur de Paris"—"Gentleman of Paris". On January 10, 1765, he married his second wife, Marie-Anne Jugier. They had two sons: Gabriel (1767–1792), who also worked in the family business and had been his assistant and heir apparent from 1790, but he died after slipping off a scaffold as he displayed a severed head to the crowd, and Henri (1769–1830), who became his successor.

In 1757, Sanson assisted his uncle Nicolas-Charles-Gabriel Sanson (1721–1795, executioner of Reims) with the extremely gruesome execution of the King's attempted assassin Robert-François Damiens. His uncle quit his position as executioner after this event. In 1778 Charles-Henri officially received the blood-red coat, the sign of the master executioner, from his father Charles-Jean-Baptiste. He would hold this position for 17 years, being succeeded by his son Henri in 1795 after he showed serious signs of illness. Most of the executions were performed by Sanson and up to six assistants.

Sanson was the first executioner to use the guillotine, and he led the initial inspection and testing of its prototype on April 17, 1792 at Bicêtre Hospital in Paris. Swift and efficient decapitations of straw bales were followed by live sheep and finally human corpses, and by the end, Sanson led the inspectors in pronouncing the new device a resounding success. Within the week, the Assembly had approved its use and on April 25, 1792, Sanson inaugurated the era of the guillotine by executing Nicolas Jacques Pelletier for robbery and assault at the Place de Grève on April 25, 1792. The use of the guillotine transformed Sanson's status under the revolutionary ideology from outcast to citizen, equal in rights and civil duties.

Charles-Henri Sanson performed 2,918 executions, including that of Louis XVI. Even though he was not a supporter of the monarchy, Sanson was initially reluctant to execute the king but in the end performed the execution. As David Jordan notes, "No Monsieur de Paris had ever had the honor of executing a king, and Sanson wanted precise instructions." Sanson experienced the political and psychological pressures of revolutionary Paris. He had the duty to execute Louis XVI under the power of the sitting Provisional Government. Being the heir to a line of executioners, to refuse this duty would have brought shame to the family name and danger to himself and to his family members. He experienced the stress of having to execute not only the king but also successive waves of ousted officials as those in power shifted rapidly in a time of revolutionary change.

However, the execution of Louis XVI was of particular importance. Fearing rescue efforts, the streets of Paris were lined with troops as Louis's carriage took its somber two hours to travel to the scaffold arriving at 10 am on January 21, 1793. After Sanson efficiently cut his hair, Louis attempted to address the crowd but was silenced with a drum roll and Louis was beheaded, with Sanson's pulling his head from the basket immediately after to show to the crowd. But the execution may not have gone as smoothly as possible: "One of two accounts of Louis' death suggest the blade did not sever his whole neck in one go, and had to be borne down on by the executioner to get a clean cut." Quite possibly, then, the execution went from being quick and fast to being more difficult and painful. As David Andress notes, however, "With his spine severed already, it is nevertheless unlikely that Louis could have uttered the 'terrible cry' that one account claims."

On July 17, 1793, Sanson executed Charlotte Corday. After Corday's decapitation, a man named Legros lifted her head from the basket and slapped it on the cheek. Sanson indignantly rejected published reports that Legros was one of his assistants. Sanson stated in his diary that Legros was in fact a carpenter who had been hired to make repairs to the guillotine. Witnesses report an expression of "unequivocal indignation" on her face when her cheek was slapped. The oft-repeated anecdote has served to suggest that victims of the guillotine may in fact retain consciousness for a short while, including by Albert Camus in his Reflections on the Guillotine. ("Charlotte Corday's severed head blushed, it is said, under the executioner's slap.") This offense against a woman executed moments before was considered unacceptable and Legros was imprisoned for three months because of his outburst.

On October 16, 1793, the queen, Marie-Antoinette, was executed by Charles-Henri's son Henri, an officer in the Garde Nationale. Sanson and his men executed successive waves of well-known revolutionaries, including Hébert, Danton, Desmoulins, Saint-Just, and Robespierre. Less known is Cécile Renault.

Guillotine proponent 
After the Revolution, Sanson was instrumental in the adoption of the guillotine as the standard form of execution. After Joseph-Ignace Guillotin publicly proposed Antoine Louis' new execution machine, Sanson delivered a memorandum of unique weight and insight to the French Assembly. Sanson, who owned and maintained all his own equipment, argued persuasively that multiple executions were too demanding for the old methods.

The relatively lightweight tools of his trade broke down under heavy usage, and the repair and replacement costs were prohibitive, unreasonably burdening the executioner. Even worse, the physical exertion required to use them was too taxing and likely to result in accidents, and the victims themselves were likely to resort to acts of desperation during the lengthy, unpredictable procedures.

Legacy 
Sanson's eldest son Gabriel (1767–1792) had been his assistant and heir apparent from 1790, but he died after slipping off a scaffold as he displayed a severed head to the crowd. With his death, the hereditary obligation fell to the youngest son. In April 1793, he handed over his office, de facto, to Henri Sanson (1767-1840), who held it until his death in 1840, a total of 47 years. Henri guillotined Marie Antoinette and the chief prosecutor Fouquier-Tinville (1795), among many others.

The Memories of Sanson are the apocryphal memoirs attributed to Charles-Henri Sanson. Published in 1830, they were written partially by Honoré de Balzac. In 1847, the last representative of the family Henry-Clément Sanson, decided, after money problems due to the gambling, to return to the text and to a supplement, under the title: Seven generations of executors, Memories of the executioner Sanson, published in 1862. Henri Clément (Henry-Clément) was the sixth and last executioner in the family. He held the office since the 1830's as an assistant, and officially from 1840 to 1847. The 159-year-long term of the family Sanson ended. 

In the late 1840s the Tussaud brothers Joseph and Francis, gathering relics for Madame Tussauds wax museum, visited the aged Henry-Clément Sanson and secured parts of one of the original guillotines used during the Age of Terror. The executioner had "pawned his guillotine, and got into woeful trouble for alleged trafficking in municipal property".

Fictionalised accounts

Novels 
 Charles-Henri's life is heavily and rather inaccurately fictionalised in German author Hans Mahner-Mons's novel Der Kavalier von Paris (E. The Sword of Satan) (1954).
 Charles-Henri Sanson appears as a minor but significant character in Hilary Mantel's novel A Place of Greater Safety (1992).
 Charles-Henri Sanson is a recurring character in the detective story series Nicolas Le Floch (first volume published in 2000).
 Jim Shepard's story "Sans Farine", from his collection Like You'd Understand, Anyway (2007), presents a fictionalised autobiography of Charles-Henri Sanson.
 He is a secondary character, playing the part of the Harvester, a being who capture the souls of criminals, in the series Le Manoir (The manor) by Évelyne Brisou-Pellen (first volume published in 2013).
 Charles-Henri Sanson is the protagonist in the historical novel The Executioner's Heir by Susanne Alleyn (2013).
In A Tale of Two Cities, Charles Dickens alludes to Charles-Henri Sanson by comparing Sanson to the biblical Samson.

Films and television 
1989 : Charles-Henri Sanson appears as a minor character played by Christopher Lee in two-part film La Révolution française.
2013 : Minor character in the television film Une femme dans la Révolution, his part is played by Thierry Hancisse.

Video games 
 He appears as an Assassin-class Servant in Type-Moon's mobile game Fate/Grand Order.
 He appears as a NPC in Assassin's Creed Unity.
 He appears as a historical figure and as vampire in the otome game "Ikemen Vampire".

Manga
Main character in the Japanese manga Innocent, which is based on his life story. He is also in Innocent Rouge, the continuation of Innocent.

Further reading 
 Geoffrey Abbott. Family of Death: Six Generations of Executioners. Robert Hale, London 1995.
 Honoré de Balzac. Un épisode sous la Terreur (fiction)
 Robert Christophe. Les Sanson, bourreaux de père en fils, pendant deux siècles. Arthème Fayard, Paris 1960.
 Guy Lenôtre. Die Guillotine und die Scharfrichter zur Zeit der französischen Revolution. Kulturverlag Kadmos, Berlin 1996. 
 Barbara Levy. Legacy of Death. Saxon House, 1973.
 Hans-Eberhard Lex. Der Henker von Paris. Charles-Henri Sanson, die Guillotine, die Opfer. Rasch u. Röhring, Hamburg 1989.  
 Chris E. Paschold, Albert Gier (Hrsg.) Der Scharfrichter - Das Tagebuch des Charles-Henri Sanson (Aus der Zeit des Schreckens 1793-1794). Insel-Verlag, Frankfurt/M. 1989; 
 Henri Sanson (ed.) Executioners All: Memoirs of the Sanson Family from Private Notes and Documents  1688-1847. Neville Spearman, London 1962.
 Henri Sanson. Tagebücher der Henker von Paris. 1685-1847. Erster und zweiter Band in einer Ausgabe, hrsg. v. Eberhard Wesemann u. Knut-Hannes Wettig. Nikol, Hamburg 2004.

References

External links 
 
 Memoirs of Henry Sansons (English)
 Sanson Family article on FR.Wikipedia (French)

Civil servants from Paris
1739 births
1806 deaths
French executioners
People of the French Revolution
Regicides of Louis XVI
Burials at Montmartre Cemetery